Antonio Scontrino (17 May 1850, Trapani – 7 January 1922, Florence) was an Italian composer.

Scontrino studied at the Palermo Conservatory from 1861 and 1870 and later in Munich.  He began performing as a double bassist in 1891.  In 1898, he became a professor of composition at the Palermo Conservatory and also taught in Florence afterwards. (Indeed, there are references to him as a teacher of counterpoint at the Florence Conservatory somewhat earlier, in 1897.)

He composed five operas (from 1879 to 1896), several large orchestral works (including symphonies), one concerto each for double bass, bassoon, and piano, four string quartets and a prelude and fugue for quartet, incidental music, pieces for piano, choral music, and lieder.

Scontrino's String Quartets are: E minor (Prelude and Fugue) 1895?; G minor in 4 movements, 1900; C major  4 movements, 1903; A minor 4 movements, 1905?; F major 4 movements, 1918?

The Conservatorio di Musica "Antonio Scontrino" in Trapani is named in his memory.

Selected works
Grande polonese
Marcia trionfale
Sinfonia marinesca 
Sinfonia romantica 
Preludio religioso
Marion De Lorme 
Idillio di Sigfrido 
Pierre Gringoire 
La cortigiana

References

External links
 
Trapani Conservatory homepage (in Italian)
Timeline of Scontrino's life (in Italian)

1850 births
1922 deaths
19th-century classical composers
20th-century classical composers
Italian classical composers
Italian male classical composers
Italian classical double-bassists
Male double-bassists
Italian opera composers
Male opera composers
People from Trapani
Italian Romantic composers
20th-century Italian composers
20th-century Italian male musicians
19th-century Italian male musicians
Composers for double bass